The following ships of the Indian Navy have been named Gomati:

 was a Type II , formerly  of the Royal Navy where it served during World War II, and commissioned into the Indian Navy in 1953

Indian Navy ship names